The Duet free routine competition of the 2016 European Aquatics Championships was held on 10 and 11 May 2016.

Results
The preliminary round was held on 10 May at 09:00. The final was held on 11 May at 16:30.

Green denotes finalists

References

Synchronised swimming